Highly Strung Hannah is a British radio situation comedy written by Robert Chantler. It was broadcast between July 2012 and August 2018 in seven series.

The series centres on Hannah Spencer, who is seriously neurotic—phobic, superstitious, obsessive, clingy, and paranoid to name but a few traits. The only reason she manages to have a relatively normal home and work life is because her husband Tim and son Josh just keep quiet and let her eccentricities wash over them as much as possible. Although she frequently exasperates those around her, everyone loves her because she has a good heart and she means well.

In 2018, there was a spin-off series called Hannah and Tim Grow Old Disgracefully, which was set in 2041 when Hannah and Tim and their friends were pensioners, and also a stand-alone stage play.

References

British comedy radio programmes